Pygarctia roseicapitis, the red-headed pygarctia moth, is a moth in the family Erebidae. It was described by Berthold Neumoegen and Harrison Gray Dyar Jr. in 1893. It is found in Mexico and in the United States from southern Arizona to Texas.

The length of the forewings is 14–17 mm. Adults are on wing from May to September.

The larvae feed on various Euphorbiaceae species, including Chamaesyce hyssopifolia. Full-grown larvae reach a length of about 30 mm.

References

Arctiidae genus list at Butterflies and Moths of the World of the Natural History Museum

Moths described in 1893
Phaegopterina